Greece competed at the 2015 European Athletics Indoor Championships in Prague, Czech Republic, from 6 to 8 March 2015 with a team of 11 athletes.

Medals

Results

See also
Greece at the European Athletics Indoor Championships

References

2015
European Athletics Championships